Kacheliba Constituency is an electoral constituency in Kenya. It is one of the four constituencies of West Pokot County. The constituency has six wards, which are represented by Members of County Assembly at the West Pokot County Assembly in Kapenguria. The constituency was established before the 1988 elections in order to cater for the interests of the Kara-Pokot community following years of under representation. The constituency was created by the Electoral Commission of Kenya through a publication in the Kenya Gazette.

Historically, Kacheliba constituency was part of the Northern Frontier District of Kenya. The constituency, along with the rest of West Pokot County and Turkana County were transferred from the Uganda Protectorate to Kenya Colony by the British colonial government in 1926.

Members of Parliament

County Assembly Wards
Kacheliba Constituency is made up of six wards, all located within West Pokot County.

References 

Constituencies in West Pokot County
Constituencies in Rift Valley Province
1988 establishments in Kenya
Constituencies established in 1988